Van Hoogstraten is a Dutch toponymic surname, meaning "from Hoogstraten" and may refer to:

Jacob van Hoogstraten (c. 1460–1527), Flemish Dominican theologian and controversialist
Dirk van Hoogstraten (1596-1640), Dutch painter
Samuel Dirksz van Hoogstraten (1627–1678), Dutch painter, poet and author on art theory
Jan van Hoogstraten (1628–1654), Dutch painter
 For other descendants of Dirk van Hoogstraten, see 
Willem van Hoogstraten (1884–1965), Dutch violinist and conductor
Jacob Emil van Hoogstraten (1898–1991), Dutch senior public servant in colonial Indonesia
Nicholas van Hoogstraten (born 1945), controversial British businessman

van Hoogstraten
Surnames of Dutch origin